Two-dimensionalism is an approach to semantics in analytic philosophy. It is a theory of how to determine the sense and reference of a word and the truth-value of a sentence. It is intended to resolve the puzzle: How is it possible to discover empirically that a necessary truth is true? Two-dimensionalism provides an analysis of the semantics of words and sentences that makes sense of this possibility. The theory was first developed by Robert Stalnaker, but it has been advocated by numerous philosophers since, including David Chalmers.

Two-dimensional semantic analysis
Any given sentence, for example, the words,

"Water is H2O"

is taken to express two distinct propositions, often referred to as a primary intension and a secondary intension, which together compose its meaning.

The primary intension of a word or sentence is its sense, i.e., is the idea or method by which we find its referent. The primary intension of "water" might be a description, such as watery stuff. The thing picked out by the primary intension of "water" could have been otherwise. For example, on some other world where the inhabitants take "water" to mean watery stuff, but, where the chemical make-up of watery stuff is not H2O, it is not the case that water is H2O for that world.

The secondary intension of "water" is whatever thing "water" happens to pick out in this world, whatever that world happens to be. So, if we assign "water" the primary intension watery stuff, then the secondary intension of "water" is H2O, since H2O is watery stuff in this world. The secondary intension of "water" in our world is H2O, which is H2O in every world because unlike watery stuff it is impossible for H2O to be other than H2O. When considered according to its secondary intension, "Water is H2O" is true in every world.

Impact
If two-dimensionalism is workable it solves some very important problems in the philosophy of language. Saul Kripke has argued that "Water is H2O" is an example of a necessary truth which is true a posteriori, since we had to discover that water was H2O, but given that it is true (which it is) it cannot be false. It would be absurd to claim that something that is water is not H2O, for these are known to be identical.

However, this contention that one and the same proposition can be both a posteriori and necessary is considered absurd by some philosophers (as is Kripke's paired claim that the same proposition can be both a priori and contingent).

For example, Robert Stalnaker's account of knowledge represents knowledge as a relation on possible worlds, which entails that it is impossible for a proposition to fail to be a priori given that it is necessary. This can be proven as follows: If a proposition P is necessary it is true in all possible worlds. If P is true at all possible worlds and what we know are sets of possible worlds, then it is not possible not to know that P, for P is the case at all possible worlds in the set of worlds that we know. So if P is necessary then we know it necessarily, and ipso facto we know it a priori.

Under two-dimensionalism, the problem disappears. The primary intension of "Water is H2O" is the a posteriori component, since it is contingent that the referent of "water" is H2O, while the secondary intension is the necessary component of the sentence, since it is necessary that the stuff we in fact call water is H2O. Neither intension gives us both a necessary and an a posteriori component. But one gets the false impression that the sentence expresses a necessary a posteriori proposition because this single sentence expresses two propositions, one a posteriori and one necessary.

In the philosophy of mind

Two-dimensional semantics has been used by David Chalmers to counter objections to the various arguments against materialism in the philosophy of mind. Specifically, Chalmers deploys two-dimensional semantics to "bridge the (gap between) epistemic and modal domains" in arguing from knowability or epistemic conceivability to what is necessary or possible (modalities).

The reason Chalmers employs two-dimensional semantics is to avoid objections to conceivability implying possibility. For instance, it's claimed that we can conceive of water not having been , but it's not possible that water isn't . Chalmers replies that it is 1-possible that water wasn't  because we can imagine another substance XYZ with watery properties, but it's not 2-possible. Hence, objections to conceivability implying possibility are unfounded when these words are used more carefully.

Chalmers then advances the following "two-dimensional argument against materialism". Define P as all physical truths about the universe and Q as a truth about phenomenal experience, such as that someone is conscious. Let "1-possible" refer to possibility relative to primary intension and "2-possible" relative to secondary intension.
 P&~Q is conceivable [i.e., zombies are conceivable]
 If P&~Q is conceivable, then P&~Q is 1-possible
 If P&~Q is 1-possible, then P&~Q is 2-possible or Russellian monism is true.
 If P&~Q is 2-possible, materialism is false.
 Materialism is false or Russellian monism is true.

Criticism
Scott Soames is a notable opponent of two-dimensionalism, which he sees as an attempt to revive Russelian–Fregean descriptivism and to overturn what he sees as a "revolution" in semantics begun by Kripke and others. Soames argues that two-dimensionalism stems from a misreading of passages in Kripke (1980) as well as Kaplan (1989).

See also
 David Kaplan

References

Sources

External links
 Two-Dimensional Semantics (Internet Encyclopedia of Philosophy)
 Two-Dimensional Semantics (Stanford Encyclopedia of Philosophy)
 Assertion by Robert Stalnaker
 Two dimensional semantics--the basics Christian Nimtz
 The Case of Hyper-intensionality in Two-Dimensional Modal Semantics: Alexandra Arapinis
 Two-Dimensionalism and Kripkean A Posteriori Necessity Kai-Yee Wong
 Sentence-Relativity and the Necessary A Posteriori Kai-Yee Wong
 Two Dimensional Semantics by David Chalmers
 The Foundations of Two Dimensional Semantics by David Chalmers
 The Two Dimensional Argument against Materialism by David Chalmers
 Two Dimensional Modal Logic by Gary Hardegree

Modal logic
Semantics
Theory of mind
Theories of language